Lakhra Power Plant (GENCO-IV) is a coal-fired power plant located in Jamshoro District, Sindh, Pakistan. It is owned and operated by generation company (GENCO-IV) namely, Lakhra Power Generation Company Limited (LPGCL).

It is the only coal fired power plant in Pakistan which is using indigenous coal of Lakhra Coal Mines. It was commissioned in 1995 and consists of 03 Units of 50 MW each with total installed capacity of 150 MW.

References

1995 establishments in Pakistan
Generation companies
Coal-fired power stations in Pakistan
Water and Power Development Authority